Quarto Pianesi (18 May 1940 – 15 January 2022) was an Italian field hockey player. He competed in the men's tournament at the 1960 Summer Olympics. 

Pianesi died from COVID-19 in San Donato Milanese, Milan, on 15 January 2022, at the age of 81.

References

External links
 

1940 births
2022 deaths
Italian male field hockey players
Olympic field hockey players of Italy
Field hockey players at the 1960 Summer Olympics
People from Macerata
Deaths from the COVID-19 pandemic in Lombardy
Sportspeople from the Province of Macerata